Buzzy Boop at the Concert is a 1938 Fleischer Studios animated short film starring Betty Boop's young tomboy cousin Buzzy Boop.

For years, it was considered a lost film, until a copy resurfaced in Russia in 2019. The film was subsequently restored by the UCLA Film and Television Archive and uploaded to their official YouTube channel.

Notes
 Beginning with this film, Betty's appearance was updated to have a more human-like head and a taller body. This was likely done to distance and modernize the character from her previous flapper-like image as seen in previous short films.

Preservation 
Buzzy Boop at the Concert was preserved and restored by the UCLA Film and Television Archive. The restoration's funding was provided by ASIFA-Hollywood in collaboration with the Packard Humanities Institute. The restoration premiered at the UCLA Festival of Preservation in 2022.

References

External links
 
 Buzzy Boop at the Concert at The Big Cartoon Database.

1938 short films
Betty Boop cartoons
1930s American animated films
American black-and-white films
1938 animated films
Paramount Pictures short films
Fleischer Studios short films
Short films directed by Dave Fleischer
1930s English-language films
American comedy short films
American animated short films